Someh Makhtum (also Romanized as Someh Makhtūm; also known as Som Makhtūm and Sa‘eh Makhtūm) is a village in Fajr Rural District, in the Central District of Gonbad-e Qabus County, Golestan Province, Iran. At the 2006 census, its population was 1,090, in 240 families.

References 

Populated places in Gonbad-e Kavus County